A Beautiful Revolution Pt. 2 is the fourteenth studio album by American rapper Common. It was released on September 10, 2021 through Loma Vista Recordings, making it his third project released for the label. It serves as a sequel to his 2020 album A Beautiful Revolution Pt. 1. Production was handled by Karriem Riggins.

Critical reception 

A Beautiful Revolution Pt. 2 was met with generally favorable reviews from music critics. At Metacritic, which assigns a weighted mean rating out of 100 to reviews from mainstream critics, the album received an average score of 72, based on eight reviews, which indicates "generally positive reviews".

Robin Murray of Clash wrote that the album "stares down the traumas that proliferate our lives, offering hope, creativity, and soul filtered through Common's profound hip-hop vision". Joe Goggins of DIY found the album "a sweet paean to music's mood-boosting properties, as well as it capacity to effect meaningful change". Ben Devlin of musicOMH wrote: "Common raps with the calm contentment of a man who's reached his destination, and it certainly sounds satisfying". Will Lavin of NME wrote: "it's rich with Afro-centric grooves and dusty drum breaks, the spirit of James Brown weaving in and out of the pro-Black messaging, which emphasises hope and progress but still acknowledges the pain and suffering endured along the way".

In mixed reviews, Mojo writer resumed "an improvement on 2020's lightweight Pt. 1". Mosi Reeves of Rolling Stone wrote: "there's enough evidence on A Beautiful Revolution, Pt. 2 to suggest that he still cares about music, but it may take more than mellow bromides and Obama shout-outs to truly convince us". The Line of Best Fit reviewer wrote: "by catering to everyone in an effort to uplift, Common doesn't connect with the listener as much as he could–and as much as he has in the past. Common's big tent might be too spacious for its own good".

Track listing

References 

2021 albums
Sequel albums
Common (rapper) albums
Loma Vista Recordings albums
Albums produced by Karriem Riggins